Hop-Çiki-Yaya (AKA: Turkish Delight Mystery) is the banner title of a series of crime fiction novels by Turkish author Mehmet Murat Somer published by İletişim Yayınları in Turkish and by Serpent's Tail and Penguin Books in English translation.

Series synopsis
The series is set in Istanbul and features an unnamed transvestite amateur sleuth and Somer explains the title; "Hop-Çiki-Yaya was a cheerleading chant from Turkish colleges in the early 1960s, and it came to be used in comedy shows to mean gays. If somebody was queenish, then they'd say 'Oh, he's Hop-Çiki-Yaya'. By the 70s, it wasn't being used anymore - so I brought it back."

Regarding his inspiration for the series, Somer has stated that, "Not only in Turkey, but in many countries, transgender people are presented in a way that I don't like at all. They are either slapstick, half-brained characters to be laughed at, or people with no moral values. My aim with the books was to do what Pedro Almodóvar does - turn the negatives into positives." "I wanted to create a likeable, intelligent, witty, refined, well educated hero/heroine with 'positive skills'. Not the typical, stereotypical drag-queen. Therefore I furnished him/her with contrasting and considerable talents… Plus lots of knowledge and warm wit. Hence I created, I believe, the first transvestite detective."

Novels
To date the series consists of seven novels (four of which have been published in English) although as Somer explains, "The order of the books is a strange story. I wrote The Kiss Murder first, but here in UK and in Turkey The Prophet Murders was published first. So, publishing wise, it is the first of the series." He also stated that, "As long as there will be readers and interest, I will produce more Hop-Ciki-Yayas."

The Prophet Murders

The Prophet Murders is the first published volume in the series.

The Kiss Murder
The Kiss Murder is the second published volume in the series.

The Gigolo Murder
The Gigolo Murder is the third published volume in the series.

The Wig Murder
The Wig Murders (AKA: The Serenity Murders) is the fourth published volume in the series.

References

Crime novel series
Turkish novels
Turkish LGBT novels